J. Dudley Goodlette (born May 18, 1948, in Hazard, Kentucky) moved to Naples, Florida, with his family in 1954, and is a lawyer. Goodlette served as a Representative in the House of Representatives of the U.S. State of Florida from 1998 to 2007, as the interim president of Edison Community College (now Edison State College) from 2011-12, and serves as Chairman of the Naples Ethics Commission.

Biography

Goodlette served in the West Point Military Academy, and received his bachelor's degree from Eastern Kentucky University in 1970, and his Juris Doctor from the University of Florida in 1972. He was in the U.S. Army in Military Intelligence from 1970-85, where he was a captain.

Goodlette served as a Representative in the House of Representatives of the U.S. State of Florida from 1998 to 2007.  As a member of the House of Representatives, he was Chairman of the Rules and Calendar Council, and Chairman of the Policy Council. 

He was the interim president of Edison Community College (now Edison State College) from 2011-12. Goodlette serves as Chairman of the Naples Ethics Commission. He is a lawyer with the law firm of Henderson, Franklin, Starnes & Holt.

After Florida Governor Ron DeSantis suspended Broward County Sheriff Scott Israel in 2019, Israel appealed his removal to the Florida Senate, which in turn appointed Goodlette to serve as special master to hear the testimony and evidence. After conducting a trial, Goodlette issued his 34-page report in September 2019, finding the removal was improper and recommending that Israel be reinstated. Despite his report and recommendation, however, the Florida Senate held a special session on October 23, 2019, and voted 25–15 to uphold the suspension.

References

External links
Official Website of Goodlette

University of Florida alumni
Eastern Kentucky University alumni
Republican Party members of the Florida House of Representatives
People from Hazard, Kentucky
United States Military Academy alumni
1948 births
Living people